Shaban Osmanov (born 17 February 1991) is a Bulgarian footballer who plays as a midfielder for Third League club Borislav Parvomay.

Career
Osmanov started his career at his hometown club Asenovets.  In July 2013, he moved to Vereya but was released after one season. Osmanov returned to Asenovets for the 2014/15 season but in February 2015 he signed for Lokomotiv Plovdiv following a successful trial period.  He made only 2 appearances in the A PFG and was released in the summer.  In August 2015, Osmanov joined Asenovets again but 6 months later he signed for Oborishte Panagyurishte.

In July 2016, Osmanov joined Borislav Parvomay.

References

External links

1991 births
Living people
Bulgarian footballers
First Professional Football League (Bulgaria) players
FC Vereya players
PFC Lokomotiv Plovdiv players
FC Oborishte players
Association football midfielders
People from Asenovgrad